Joseph Fischler was a Swiss cyclist. He competed in the team pursuit event at the 1928 Summer Olympics.

References

External links
 

Year of birth missing
Possibly living people
Swiss male cyclists
Olympic cyclists of Switzerland
Cyclists at the 1928 Summer Olympics
Place of birth missing